

History 
The MacNeills originate from Scotland. The MacNeill name is linked to the Scottish clan of the same name and is associated with the Outer Hebrides island of Barra, and the Inner Hebrides islands of Colonsay and Gigha. Clan MacNeill has a long and distinguished history. Recent genealogy studies have shown that Clan MacNeill is of Norse-Gael descent, rather than Irish as was once believed.

People 
Conor MacNeill (born 1988), Northern Irish actor
Craig William Macneill, American film director, writer and editor
Daniel MacNeill (1885–1946), Canadian businessman and politician
Dick MacNeill (1898–1963), Dutch association football player
Eoin MacNeill (1867–1945), Irish scholar
Francis MacNeill (1912–2000), Canadian educator and politician
Hector Macneill (1746–1818), Scottish poet
Hubert B. MacNeill (1922–2020), Canadian physician and politician
Hugo MacNeill (disambiguation), multiple people
James MacNeill (disambiguation), multiple people
Jennifer Carroll MacNeill (born 1980), Irish politician
John MacNeill (disambiguation), multiple people
Karen MacNeill (born 1972), Canadian field hockey player
Leonard M. MacNeill (1883–1932), Canadian accountant and politician
Máire MacNeill (1904–1987), Irish journalist, folklorist and translator
Meredith MacNeill (born 1975), Canadian actress and comedian
Michele MacNeill (1957–2007), American murder victim
Murray Macneill (1877–1951), Canadian curler
Peter MacNeill, Canadian actor
Robbie MacNeill (born 1946/47), Canadian singer-songwriter
Torquil MacNeill, 16th-century Scottish chief

As first name
MacNeill Weir (1877–1939), Scottish politician

Businesses 
MacNeill Secondary School, a secondary school in Richmond, British Columbia, Canada

See also 
McNeil (disambiguation)
McNeill (disambiguation)
MacNeil
Mac Néill
McNeal
MacNeal
MacNeille

Scottish surnames
Clan MacNeil
Patronymic surnames
Surnames from given names